Muhammad Syaiful bin Alias (born 4 February 1999) is a Malaysian professional footballer who plays as a centre-back.

Honours
Malaysia U19
 AFF U-19 Youth Championship: 2018; runner-up: 2017

References

External links
 

Living people
1999 births
People from Kelantan
Malaysian people of Malay descent
Malaysian footballers
Kelantan FA players
Association football defenders
Malaysia Super League players
Malaysia Premier League players
Malaysia youth international footballers